Digi-Key is a privately held American company that distributes electronic components. Headquartered in Thief River Falls in the U.S. state of Minnesota, the company is the fourth largest electronic component distributor in North America and the fifth largest electronic component distributor in the world. Founded in 1972 by Ronald Stordahl, its name is a reference to the "Digi-Keyer Kit", a digital electronic keyer kit that he developed and marketed to amateur radio enthusiasts. He continues to privately own the company.

History 
After earning a degree in electrical engineering at the University of Minnesota, Ronald Stordahl returned to his hometown of Thief River Falls, Minnesota where he took up ham radio in the early 1970s. Stordahl created a kit of electronic parts to improve transmission of Morse code over his radio. He soon began selling kits to other ham operators, and eventually branched off into the distribution of other electronic components, allowing customers to purchase parts in any quantity, no matter how small. The company quickly grew and by 1984 it was located in a one million square foot facility next door to Arctic Cat, a snowmobile manufacturer.

In 1996, Digi-Key launched their website, gradually shifting focus towards e-commerce. The first international domain was launched in 1996 in Canada, this would later expand to over 40 local domains.

Mark Larson, who joined Digi-Key in 1976 as its general manager, became president in 1985. He has led the company from its initial focus on the hobbyist market to the expanded market it serves today. In 2015 Larson stepped down from his role within the company and transitioned to a board position. On June 1, 2015 Dave Doherty, who served as the Executive Vice President of Operations at Digi-Key, transitioned to Larson's position as President and Chief Operating Officer.

Digi-Key continued to grow following the recession in 2008. By 2017, Digi-Key was located in a single, centralized location in Thief River Falls, Minnesota that measured . In 2017 the company began work on a one million square foot expansion to their Thief River Falls facility at an expected cost of $200 million to $300 million. The expansion was helped by government incentives and tax exemptions and was expected to add another 1,000 jobs at Digi-Key.

By 2018, the company had annual revenue of $2.3 billion and more than 3,500 employees.

In March 2018, Digi-Key announced an expansion for a 1 million square foot building with over 2.2 million square feet of usable space. This space will include receiving, shipping, warehouse, and storage space for the nearly 1.5 million products ready for immediate shipment. The building was officially opened on August 17, 2022.

On September 29, 2021, Digi-Key announced a global distribution partnership with QuickLogic Corporation, a fabless semiconductor company. 

In November 2022, Digi-Key was awarded their first patent for a 'Tray for transporting and storing electronic components'.

See also 
 E-commerce
 List of Minnesota companies

References

Further reading
 

Electronic component distributors
Amateur radio companies
Business services companies established in 1972
Distribution companies of the United States
Companies based in Minnesota
Industrial supply companies
Privately held companies based in Minnesota
Thief River Falls, Minnesota